Timothy Robert Rollinson (born 1959) in Bolton, England is an Australian jazz guitarist and composer who was a founder of the acid jazz group Directions in Groove (D.I.G.) (1991–1998, 2008) as well as his own trio, quartets and studio project, The Modern Congress. His work for D.I.G. included winning two APRA Awards for song writing, 1994 'Best Jazz Composition' for "Favourite" and 1996 'Most Performed Jazz Work' for "Futures". As well as two ARIA Music Award nominations, 1994 'Breakthrough Artist – Single' for "Re-Invent Yourself" and 1995 'Breakthrough Artist – Album' for Deeper. He released two solo albums, Cause and Effect in 1997 and You Tunes in 2010.

Biography
Timothy Robert Rollinson was born in 1959 in Bolton, England. He joined cabaret band Pressed Meat & the Smallgoods in Sydney in mid-1989 on guitar which included Kathy Wemyss (ex-Chad's Tree). Both were recruited to perform and record with The Blackeyed Susans from late 1990 to early 1991. The group had formed in Perth, Western Australia in 1989 and relocated to Sydney and collected new members.

In 1991 Rollinson was the founding guitarist for acid jazz group Directions in Groove (D.I.G.). He contributed song writing to the group's three albums. Rollinson released a solo album, Cause and Effect in 1997 on Mercury Records. The third album for D.I.G., Curvystrasse, followed in 1998 and the group disbanded thereafter. They briefly reformed in 2008 for the Remixed Live Tour. His work for D.I.G. included winning two APRA Awards for song writing, 1994 'Best Jazz Composition' for "Favourite" and 1996 'Most Performed Jazz Work' for "Futures". As well as two ARIA Music Award nominations, 1994 'Breakthrough Artist – Single' for "Re-Invent Yourself" and 1995 'Breakthrough Artist – Album' for Deeper.

Rollinson has performed with Vince Jones, Louis Tillett, Tim Hopkins, Tony Buck, Joe Lane, Barney McAll and David Watson.

Rollinson has written music for theatre, short films, two features and for television. He released his second solo album, You Tunes, on Rufus Records in June 2010.

Discography

Albums
Band member, solo projects

Guest musician
Anchor Me (EP) – The Blackeyed Susans (March 1991, Waterfront Records)
 1991    Peter Dasent  Dir: Peter Jackson   Meet The Feebles  Q.D.K Media
 1991    Grant McLennan (Go-Betweens)   Watershed          White Label
Welcome Stranger – The Blackeyed Susans (August 1992, Waterfront)
 1992    Caroline Loftus                               Sugar                 Larrikin
 1993    Ian Cooper                                     Soundpost         Larrikin
 1994    Tim Hopkins                                   Pandora’s Box   ABC
 1994    Peggy Van Zalm                            Shine / Soul Magic
 1997    Zeek’s Beek                                   Zeek’s Beek       ABC Jazz
 2004    Inga Liljestrom                               Elk
 2007    Steve Morrison and Jeff Duff         So Quiet
 2007    Dave Mason (The Reels)              Reelsville
 2007    Betty Vale                                      Red
 2009    Steve Morrison                              Live at the Basement
2009    Gerard Masters                             Spin (EP)

Compilation albums
2005     Australia Select  3                          National Gallery Of Victoria
2005     Lazy Days & Sundays 2                 Instinctive Travels
2005     Bondi Calling 3                               Vitamin
2005     Vine Time                                        Instinctive Travels
2005     Mi Casa Tu Casa                            Casa Del Discos
2001     State Of The Union                         EMF          (US release)
1998     Groove Hip Hop                              Blue Note
1995     The Soul Of Jazz Volume 3            Verve         (Europe)
1993     Triple J Live At The Wireless 3      ABC
1991     Triple J Live At The Wireless         Mushroom

References

General
  Note: Archived [on-line] copy has limited functionality.
Specific

External links

1959 births
Australian jazz guitarists
Living people
Directions in Groove members